"Tsunami" is a song by Italian singer Annalisa. It was written by Annalisa, Davide Simonetta and Alessandro Raina, and produced by Simonetta.

It was released by Warner Music Italy on 4 September 2020 as the third single from her studio album Nuda. The song peaked at number 83 on the FIMI Singles Chart and was certified gold in Italy.

Music video
A music video to accompany the release of "Tsunami" was then released onto YouTube on 8 September 2020. The video was directed by Giacomo Triglia and shot in the Maremma Regional Park, near Alberese, Grosseto.

Track listing

Charts

Certifications

References

2020 singles
2020 songs
Annalisa songs
Songs written by Davide Simonetta
Songs written by Annalisa